Stupino is a rural locality (a village) in Bryzgalovskoye Rural Settlement, Kameshkovsky District, Vladimir Oblast, Russia. The population was 101 as of 2010.

Geography 
Stupino is located on the Seksha River, 16 km northeast of Kameshkovo (the district's administrative centre) by road. Imeni Kirova is the nearest rural locality.

References 

Rural localities in Kameshkovsky District